Upsilon Phi Sigma, abbreviated as UPS, is a Philippine Inter-University and Collegiate Fraternity and Sorority which claims to have been established in the University of the Philippines Los Baños on February 14, 1935. However, this assertion has continuously been questioned as a fabricated story because there is no record of the existence of the Upsilon Phi Sigma in the University of the Philippines. While their own accounts consider it one of the oldest known fraternal organizations in the Philippines, there has been no documentary evidence to support this, and the fraternity may have been created much later. As of 2020, the organization is composed of 230 chapters in 16 local councils and 8 international councils.

Traditions
The organization practices many traditions. The most important of these traditions is the giving of 100 red roses every Valentine's Day during the Founding Anniversary. This is guided by the Latin motto, Unitas, Pax, Et Salus! ("Unity, Peace, and Prosperity for All!"). The organization's official symbol is the shield, signifying the strong establishment of the organization in the early 1900s. Due to the active expansion efforts of the members, Upsilon Phi Sigma continues to offer humanitarian services to the schools and communities of the Philippines.

Claimed history
Upsilon Phi Sigma Honor and Excellence Service Fraternity was originally organized by seven students from different colleges of the University of the Philippines on February 14, 1935 (Valentine's Day) purposefully, to emphasize its concepts of love and peace. This foundation day is a very important day in the lives of many Upsilonians. Since then, it has been celebrated annually with many activities, as well as renewals of fraternal vows of commitment and dedication to the UPS ideals.
On May 14, 1935, the Seven Founders and other original members wrote a comprehensive Constitution and By-Laws document encompassing the fraternal principles, concepts of love and peace, and doctrines of self- and organizational disciplines, under the motto of Honour, Service, and Excellence in all its activities. Since then, the Fraternity has also promoted its adherence and respect to the ideals and authorities of the Republic.
Many students from various schools in Metro Manila clamored to be admitted to the newly organized Upsilon Phi Sigma, which had decided by that time to include women in its roster of membership to constitute the Sorority. From that time on, the Upsilon Phi Sigma Fraternity and Sorority has expanded its membership and leadership with hundreds of chapters organized not only in Metro Manila but in areas of Luzon, Visayas, and Mindanao. At present, it also has chapters and alumni groups in other countries like Australia, New Zealand, the United States, Canada, Germany, Taiwan, and Saudi Arabia; and community chapters in Kota Kinabalu, Malaysia and other parts of Asia.

While the Upsilon Phi Sigma asserts that it was created in 1935, there is no documentary evidence to prove that it existed before the Second World War. There is also no record of the existence of the Upsilon Phi Sigma in the University of the Philippines. It also claims that the "Upsilon Alpha" and "Upsilon Beta" chapters are in UP Los Baños and Diliman respectively. But there is no record of the existence of Upsilon Phi Sigma in UP Los Baños. While UP Diliman did not exist as a campus until 1949 and has had no record of an Upsilon Phi Sigma since then. Finally, none of their alleged founders were alumni of the University of the Philippines in Los Baños from the late 1930s to early 1940s, leading many fraternity historians to believe that the foundation story and list of founders was fabricated to claim lineage. There is reason to believe that the "Upsilon Gamma" chapter is in actuality the first chapter and the fraternity was organized in Manuel L. Quezon University in the late 1960s.

Alumni Association

The National Executive Council (NEC) and Upsilon Phi Sigma Alumni Association (UPSAA) are two of the fraternity/sorority's alumni organization.

Conventions

4th National Convention on October 21–23, 2011, at Philtown Hotel, Cagayan de Oro City.

See also
List of fraternities and sororities in the Philippines

External links
 Upsilon Phi Sigma chapter list
 The Official Website of Upsilon Phi Sigma - United Arab Emirates Council

References

Student societies in the Philippines
Fraternities and sororities in the Philippines
Student organizations established in 1935
1935 establishments in the Philippines